Laryngeal cysts are cysts involving the larynx or more frequently supraglottic locations, such as epiglottis and vallecula. Usually they do not extend to the thyroid cartilage. They may be present congenitally or may develop eventually due to degenerative cause. They often interfere with phonation.

Presentation
Hoarseness is the most common presenting symptom, while pain, stridor or laryngeal obstruction are unusual complaints. They may cause significant respiratory obstruction leading to dyspnoea or respiratory distress and even cyanosis, and jugular and epigastric retractions. Congenital lesions may present with severe airway obstruction at birth calling for emergency intervention and intubation.

Diagnosis

Types
There are three types of laryngeal cysts, namely, mucous, hemorrhagic and congenital. However, a new classification system for congenital laryngeal cysts on the basis of the extent of the cyst and the embryologic tissue of origin, is proposed for the ease of initial surgical management.

Treatment
Treatment can be medical or surgical. Laser endoscopic treatment is often preferred. Voice therapy is sometimes necessary.

Epidemiology
Congenital cysts of the larynx with incidence of about 1.8 in 100,000 newborns.

Laryngeal cysts form 4% of all laryngeal tumors or about 5% of benign laryngeal lesions. Prevalence is about equal between the sexes.

See also
 Vocal fold nodule

References

External links 

Phonation
Voice disorders
Congenital disorders of respiratory system